Pis is a village in south-western France.

Pis, PiS or PIS may also refer to:
 P.I.S. – Politiets Indsats Styrke, a 2001 Danish mockumentary
 Polled Intersex Syndrome, a disorder of sexual development found in Goats
 Law and Justice, a Polish political party
 State Sanitary Inspection in Poland, Państwowa Inspekcja Sanitarna
 Manneken Pis, a 1619 sculpture of a urinating boy, a Brussels landmark
 Pakistan International School (disambiguation)
 Passenger information system at a railway station
 Phoenix Indian School
 Pijin language, a language spoken in the Solomon Islands
 Ping Shan stop in Hong Kong (Station code: PIS)
 Platform Invocation Services (Microsoft)
 Poitiers–Biard Airport in France (IATA code: PIS)

See also
 PI (disambiguation)
 Piss (disambiguation)